Spatulignatha chrysopteryx is a moth in the family Lecithoceridae. It is found in China.

References

Moths described in 1994
Spatulignatha
Moths of Asia